Daurenbek Tazhimbetov (born 2 July 1985 is a Kazakh football player who plays for FC Akzhayik.

Career
In July 2013, Tazhimbetov joined FC Astana on loan.

Career statistics

Club career statistics 
Last update: 28 October 2012

International goals

References

External links

Daurenbek Tazhimbetov at Footballdatabase

1985 births
Living people
Kazakhstani footballers
Kazakhstan international footballers
Kazakhstan Premier League players
FC Shakhter Karagandy players
FC Astana players
FC Ordabasy players
FC Kaisar players
FC Taraz players
Association football forwards